Robert Emmett Lee (October 12, 1868 – November 19, 1916) was a Democratic member of the U.S. House of Representatives from Pennsylvania.

Biography
Robert E. Lee was born in Pottsville, Pennsylvania. He was apprenticed to the blacksmith's trade, engaged in mercantile pursuits in Pottsville. He served as Schuylkill County treasurer in 1905, and was an unsuccessful candidate for election in 1908.

Lee was elected as a Democrat to the Sixty-second and Sixty-third Congresses.  He served as Chairman of the United States House Committee on Mileage during the Sixty-second Congress. He was an unsuccessful candidate for reelection in 1914. He resumed his former business activities in Pottsville. He was an unsuccessful candidate for election in 1916.

He died in Pottsville, aged 48, and is buried in St. Patrick's Cemetery.

Sources

The Political Graveyard

1868 births
1916 deaths
Politicians from Pottsville, Pennsylvania
Democratic Party members of the United States House of Representatives from Pennsylvania
19th-century American politicians